André Bramard (15 May 1915 – 7 September 2009) was a French racing cyclist. He rode in the 1937 Tour de France.

References

1915 births
2009 deaths
French male cyclists
Place of birth missing